Francisco 'Fran' García Solsona (born 7 December 1992) is a Spanish footballer who plays mainly as a left back for Burgos CF.

Club career
Born in Villarreal, Valencian Community, García was a youth product at local club Villarreal CF, making his senior debut in 2009 and going on to spend several seasons in Tercera División with the C team. On 19 June 2010 he made his first appearance with the reserves, playing ten minutes in a 1–2 home loss against UD Salamanca in the Segunda División.

On 16 July 2014, after featuring regularly for the B side in Segunda División B, García signed a two-year contract with Albacete Balompié, recently returned to the second tier. On 22 January of the following year, he returned to Villarreal B on loan until June.

In the 2016 summer, García moved abroad and joined Romanian side ASA 2013 Târgu Mureș, but returned to Spain and joined third level side CF Fuenlabrada in September due to the former's economic problems. He returned to the second division on 7 July 2018, after returning to Alba.

On 10 July 2021, free agent García agreed to a contract with Burgos CF also in division two.

References

External links

1992 births
Living people
People from Villarreal
Sportspeople from the Province of Castellón
Spanish footballers
Footballers from the Valencian Community
Association football defenders
Segunda División players
Segunda División B players
Tercera División players
Villarreal CF C players
Villarreal CF B players
Albacete Balompié players
CF Fuenlabrada footballers
Burgos CF footballers
ASA 2013 Târgu Mureș players
Spanish expatriate footballers
Expatriate footballers in Romania
Spanish expatriate sportspeople in Romania